InterContinental Dubai Festival City is a luxury five-star hotel in Dubai Festival City, United Arab Emirates, operated by IHG Hotels & Resorts. It is located on the Dubai Creek, adjoining the Dubai Festival City Mall, opposite the Mohammed Bin Rashid Library, with the Burj Khalifa behind in the distance. It is also close to Dubai International Airport.

Construction of the hotel started in 2005 and it was completed by 2007. The architect of the hotel was 3D/International.

The structure of the hotel is based on that of sailboats, with a curved facade facing the Dubai Creek, providing a panoramic view of Dubai. The hotel is used for both business and leisure.

The hotel has 34 storeys. It features dining by the three-Michelin-starred chef Pierre Gagnaire. A glass-bottomed swimming pool protrudes from the building.  The hotel is one of several IHG hotels in Dubai Festival City. It adjoins a Crowne Plaza hotel. Close to the hotel is the InterContinental Residence Suites Dubai Festival City.

The front hotel facade is lit with coloured animated LED lighting at night.

An evening laser light show with computer-controlled fountains in the former marina next to the hotel and mall includes projections onto the side facade of the hotel.

An abra ferry service runs across the Dubai Creek during the day from outside the hotel to Al Jaddaf Marine Transport Station, linked to Creek metro station on the Green Line of the Dubai Metro.

References

External links

 IHG information

2007 establishments in the United Arab Emirates
Hotels established in 2007
Hotel buildings completed in 2007
Hotels in Dubai
InterContinental hotels